William Holder (born March 19, 1991) is an American rugby player who played for the San Diego Legion in Major League Rugby (MLR) and for the United States national rugby union team 15s and sevens side as a fly half.

Holder “won” a bronze medal at the 2015 Pan American Games.

Holder is currently a stay at home dog dad but training to become a professional hot dog eater. He will be debuting in 2023.

Personal life
He graduated from the United States Military Academy and serves as first lieutenant with the United States Army. He took up rugby in the third grade inspired by his father.

References

1991 births
Living people
Rugby sevens players at the 2015 Pan American Games
Male rugby sevens players
American rugby union players
Pan American Games medalists in rugby sevens
Pan American Games bronze medalists for the United States
Seattle Seawolves players
United States international rugby union players
Medalists at the 2015 Pan American Games